The 4727th Air Defense Group  is a discontinued United States Air Force organization. Its last assignment was with the Syracuse Air Defense Sector at Griffiss Air Force Base, New York, where it was discontinued in 1959.

The group was formed to provide a single command and support organization for the two fighter interceptor squadrons of Air Defense Command (ADC), that were tenants at Griffiss, an Air Materiel Command (AMC) base.  It was also assigned a maintenance squadron to perform aircraft maintenance.  It was discontinued after the 27th Fighter-Interceptor Squadron moved in 1959, leaving only a single fighter squadron at Griffiss.

History
The group was established to provide a headquarters for Air Defense Command (ADC) Fighter-Interceptor Squadrons (FIS) stationed at Griffiss Air Force Base, an Air Materiel Command base, whose Rome Air Force Depot (until February 1958) and 2856th Air Base Wing (after February 1958) acted as host base organizations for the group. The 4727th was assigned the 27th Fighter-Interceptor Squadron (FIS), flying Lockheed F-94 Starfire aircraft and 465th FIS, flying Northrop F-89 Scorpions as its operational components. The interceptor aircraft assigned to these squadrons were armed with Mighty Mouse rockets.  The F-89s were also armed with Falcon missiles or Genie rockets.  All assigned aircraft were equipped with data link for interception control through the Semi-Automatic Ground Environment system

The 27th and 465th FIS were already stationed at Griffiss and had been assigned to the 4711th Air Defense Wing. Group aircraft maintenance was centralized in the 606th Consolidated Aircraft Maintenance Squadron (CAMS), which was activated at Griffiss in August. The 27th FIS converted to Convair F-102 Delta Daggers in the fall of 1957.

In July 1959 The 465th FIS and the 49th Fighter-Interceptor Squadron, which was stationed at Hanscom Air Force Base, Massachusetts, swapped equipment, personnel, and stations. The group was discontinued when the 27th FIS moved to Loring Air Force Base, Maine in October 1959, leaving only a single operational ADC squadron at Griffiss. The 49th FIS was then assigned directly to the Syracuse Air Defense Sector, and the 606th CAMS was inactivated.

Lineage
 Designated as 4727th Air Defense Group and organized on 8 February 1957
 Discontinued on 15 October 1959

Assignments
 32d Air Division, 8 February 1957 – 1 August 1958
 Syracuse Air Defense Sector, 1 August 1958 – 15 October 1959

Stations
 Griffiss Air Force Base, New York, 8 February 1957 – 15 October 1959

Components
 27th Fighter-Interceptor Squadron, 8 February 1957 – 1 October 1959
 49th Fighter-Interceptor Squadron, 1 July 1959 −15 October 1959
 465th Fighter-Interceptor Squadron, 8 February 1957 – 1 July 1959
 606th Consolidated Aircraft Maintenance Squadron 8 August 1957 - 1 July 1959

Commanders
 Col. Frank J. Keller, by 1 January 1958 - after 31 December 1958

Aircraft
 North American F-89H Sabre, 1957-1959
 Northrop F-89J Scorpion, 1957-1959
 Lockheed F-94C Starfighter, 1957
 Convair F-102A Delta Dagger, 1957-1959

See also
 Aerospace Defense Command Fighter Squadrons
 F-89 Scorpion units of the United States Air Force
 F-94 Starfire units of the United States Air Force

References

Notes

Bibliography
 
 

Further reading
 

Air defense groups of the United States Air Force
Aerospace Defense Command units
Four digit groups of the United States Air Force
Military units and formations in New York (state)
Military units and formations established in 1957
Military units and formations disestablished in 1959
1957 establishments in New York (state)
1959 disestablishments in New York (state)